Clare is a city mostly in Clare County in the U.S. state of Michigan.  A small portion of the city extends south into Isabella County.  The population was 3,254 at the 2020 census.

Clare was settled as early as 1870 and contains two listings on the National Register of Historic Places: the Clare Downtown Historic District and the Clare Congregational Church.  The city is located along the junction of U.S. Route 10 and U.S. Route 127, and each highway has a business route (Bus. 10 and Bus. US 127) through the downtown area.  M-115 also runs through the city.

History
Clare was founded with the coming of the Pere Marquette railroad in 1870.  It was named after the county, which was named after County Clare in Ireland.  The Clare post office opened on January 20, 1871.  It incorporated as a village in 1879 and as a city in 1891.

Cops & Doughnuts is a bakery that opened in 2009 in the former Clare City Bakery that dates back to 1896.

Geography

The south branch of the Tobacco River flows through the city and also contains Lake Shamrock.

Climate
This climatic region is typified by large seasonal temperature differences, with warm to hot (and often humid) summers and cold (sometimes severely cold) winters.  According to the Köppen Climate Classification system, Clare has a humid continental climate, abbreviated "Dfb" on climate maps.

Transportation

Major highways
 runs along the northeastern portion of the city.
 runs south–north along the western boundary of the city and merges with US 10.
 is a business loop route through downtown Clare.
 is a business loop route that has portions concurrent with Bus. US 10 in downtown Clare.
 enters from the west and has its eastern terminus at Bus. US 127 / Bus. US 10 in downtown Clare.

Airport
 Clare Municipal Airport is a public airport located in the northeast corner of the city limits.

Bus
Indian Trails has a station in Clare that provides daily intercity bus service between St. Ignace and East Lansing.

Trails
Pere Marquette Rail-Trail is a rail trail that has its western terminus in Clare.
Pere Marquette State Trail is a bicycle and multi-use trail that runs through the city.

Demographics

2010 census
As of the census of 2010, there were 3,118 people, 1,354 households, and 764 families residing in the city. The racial makeup of the city was 85.0% White, 4.7% African American, 0.9% Native American, 6.1% Asian, 1.5% from other races, and 1.8% from two or more races. Hispanic or Latino of any race were 6.5% of the population.

There were 1,354 households, of which 31.7% had children under the age of 18 living with them, 36.0% were married couples living together, 15.7% had a female householder with no husband present, 4.7% had a male householder with no wife present, and 43.6% were non-families. 36.9% of all households were made up of individuals, and 13.1% had someone living alone who was 65 years of age or older. The average household size was 2.22 and the average family size was 2.88.

The median age in the city was 36.1 years. 23.9% of residents were under the age of 18; 11.9% were between the ages of 18 and 24; 24.3% were from 25 to 44; 22.9% were from 45 to 64; and 16.9% were 65 years of age or older. The gender makeup of the city was 45.2% male and 54.8% female.

2000 census
As of the census of 2000, there were 3,173 people, 1,380 households, and 783 families residing in the city. The racial makeup of the city was 89.35% White, 8.25% African American, 0.60% Native American, 0.50% Asian, 0.41% from other races, and 0.88% from two or more races. Hispanic or Latino of any race were 9.58% of the population.

There were 1,380 households out of which 29.4% had children under the age of 18 living with them, 40.9% were married couples living together, 13.0% had a female householder with no husband present, and 43.2% were non-families. 38.0% of all households were made up of individuals and 17.8% had someone living alone who was 65 years of age or older.  The average household size was 2.20 and the average family size was 2.92.

In the city the population was spread out with 24.7% under the age of 18, 10.1% from 18 to 24, 25.3% from 25 to 44, 19.4% from 45 to 64, and 20.5% who were 65 years of age or older.  The median age was 37 years. For every 100 females there were 78.1 males.  For every 100 females age 18 and over, there were 72.1 males.

The median income for a household in the city was $27,299, and the median income for a family was $36,194. Males had a median income of $28,365 versus $19,861 for females. The per capita income for the city was $18,006.  About 10.6% of families and 16.0% of the population were below the poverty line, including 16.3% of those under age 18 and 13.3% of those age 65 or over.

Education
The city of Clare is served entirely by its own school district, Clare Public Schools, which is centrally located within the city and serves the southeastern portion of the Clare County and the northeastern portion of Isabella County.

Sister cities

Ennis, Ireland since 1986
Nakhodka, Russia since 1997
Nantong, China since 2005
Surulere, Nigeria since 2009
Ipoh, Malaysia since 2010
Dharavi, India since 2011

Notable people
Fred C. Reger, Wisconsin state politician, born in Clare
Debbie Stabenow, politician currently serving in the U.S. Senate, grew up in Clare
Wayne Terwilliger, World War II veteran and Major League Baseball player, born in Clare

Images

References

External links
City of Clare official website
Clare Public Schools
Clare Chamber of Commerce website

Cities in Clare County, Michigan
Cities in Isabella County, Michigan
Superfund sites in Michigan
1870 establishments in Michigan
Populated places established in 1870